"All You Ever Do Is Bring Me Down" is a song written by Raul Malo and Al Anderson, and recorded by American country music group The Mavericks featuring accordionist Flaco Jiménez. It was released in January 1996 as the second single from the 1995 album Music for All Occasions. The song reached number 13 on the Billboard Hot Country Singles & Tracks chart, representing the band's highest entry there, and Jiménez's only entry.

Music video
The music video was directed by Gerry Wenner and was filmed in Santa Fe, New Mexico. It premiered in January 1996.

Chart performance
"All You Ever Do Is Bring Me Down" debuted at number 66 on the U.S. Billboard Hot Country Singles & Tracks for the week of January 20, 1996.

References

1995 songs
1996 singles
The Mavericks songs
Songs written by Al Anderson (NRBQ)
Songs written by Raul Malo
Song recordings produced by Don Cook
MCA Records singles